Aéroplanes Hanriot et Cie. or simply 'Hanriot'  was a French aircraft manufacturer with roots going back to the beginning of aviation. Founded by René Hanriot in 1910 as The Monoplans Hanriot Company Ltd. the company survived in different forms until 1916 when it established itself with the Hanriot-Dupont (HD.) fighters and observation aircraft. The company lasted through several takeovers and structural changes until in 1936 it merged with Farman to become the Société Nationale de Constructions Aéronautiques du Centre (SNCAC). 'Central Air Works' consortium.
 
Hanriot aeroplanes included pre-war monoplanes with boat-like fuselages, the HD.1 and 2 World War I biplane fighters, the HD.14 trainer, and the H.220 series of twin-engined heavy fighters that eventually evolved in the SNCAC 600 fighter just before World War II.

The company's main bases of operations were Bétheny (a suburb of Reims) Boulogne-Billancourt, Carrières-sur-Seine and Bourges.

History

René Hanriot, a builder and racer of motor boats and a race car driver for the Darracq motor company, built his first aircraft in 1907, although it did not fly until late 1909.  It was a monoplane with a wire-braced wooden fuselage resembling the Blériot XI but was almost immediately superseded by a series of similar monoplanes, which were exhibited at the Brussels Salon d'Automobiles, d'Aeronautique, du Cycles et dus Sports  in  January 1910. These featured a slender wooden monocoque fuselage and were powered by a 20 hp Darracq and a 40 hp Gyp. and a handful were built. Together with Darracq racing colleague Louis Wagner, Hanriot started a flying school at Bétheny near Reims, where the Hanriot factory was located. Beatrix de Rijk, the first Dutch women to earn a pilot's licence learned to fly there. Unusually, Hanriot tested new design features using a flying model powered by a 2 kW (3 hp) Duthiel-Chalmers.

In 1910 Hanriot and his staff pilots made regular appearances at air shows in France and England.  Hanriot's 15-year-old son Marcel Hanriot became the youngest holder of a pilot's certificate, and joined his father's pilots as a competition flyer. René Hanriot then withdrew from competition flying himself and concentrated on constructing aircraft.

Hanriot's 1911 military two-seater was passed over at the French military trials, among other reasons because its fuselage was so slender that the crew were completely unshielded. It was obsolete and never had a serious chance against contemporary Nieuport, Morane-Saulnier and Deperdussin types. Nieuport's former chief engineer Alfred Pagny designed the 1912 Hanriot, and the Nieuport influence was clearly visible,  but it failed to gain any orders at the 1912 military trials and attempts to sell them were unsuccessful. Faced with bankruptcy, René Hanriot sold his assets to Louis Alfred Ponnier, who reorganized the company as the Société de Construction de Machines pour la Navigation Aérienne (CMNA), headed by Pagny. In 1913, Marcel Hanriot, now 18, was called up for military service.

The Ponnier factory continued for several years to develop the monoplane racer, one of which was placed second in the 1913 Gordon Bennett Trophy competition.

Following the outbreak of World War I, Marcel Hanriot, still in military service, flew French air force bombers. The German advance stalled with the CMNA/Ponnier factories in Rheims behind German lines, but René Hanriot founded a new factory, Aéroplanes Hanriot et Cie, in Levallois. Starting as a subcontractor building airplane components, the company progressed to licence-build aircraft from other manufacturers (notably the Sopwith 1 A.2 and Salmson 2 A.2). In 1915, Marcel Hanriot, after being seriously wounded in a night-flying raid, was released from military service and joined his father's factory. Around the same time, Hanriot hired the young engineer Emile Dupont and in 1916, the Dupont-designed fighter HD.1 was produced. Although being passed over by the French air force in favor of the more powerful SPAD VII design, the HD.1 was ordered by the Belgian and Italian air force. Heavy demand resulted in a new factory being opened in Boulogne-Billancourt (84, rue des Moulineaux). Licences to build the HD.1 were also sold to Macchi in Italy. Hanriot produced 5000 aircraft and employed 2000 workers in his Boulogne-Billancourt factory alone.

After the war, Hanriot continued as a manufacturer of fighters and all-purpose aircraft, building on the HD.1 / HD.2 series but also bringing out new biplane and monoplane designs. In 1924, having outgrown its Boulogne-Billancourt works, the company moved to Carrières-sur-Seine

René Hanriot died on 7 November 1925. His heirs, Marcel and his two brothers-in-law, entrusted daily operations of the factories to Outhenin Chalandre, formerly director of a paper mill. In 1930 the Hanriot company became part of the Lorraine-Dietrich company under the name Lorraine-Hanriot. The merger lasted three years, until in 1933 the two companies separated and Marcel Hanriot stepped once again forward to lead his family business. Under his management, the company embarked on an ambitious project to design and build state-of-the-art metal military aircraft like the H.220 heavy fighter. However its main successes would be with the liaison/training monoplane H.180/H.182 and the twin-engined H.232/H.232 trainer

In 1936 the company was included in Pierre Cot's nationalisation programme, Merging with Farman to become the Société Nationale de Constructions Aéronautiques du Centre in 1937. Unlike Maurice Farman, who left the new company in protest, Marcel Hanriot stayed on as one of the directors.

Nomenclature
 The pre-war aircraft designed by René Hanriot went by Roman Numerals, the 1907 monoplane being the 'Type I'. Commonly however the planes were known by a description usually featuring the year of built and some characteristic such as 'monoplane', one- or two-seater, engine and horsepower. Thus Hanriot's first airplane was the '1907 monoplane', the type IV was the '1911 military two-seater' and the Hanriot VIII was known as the 'Hanriot 100 ch' (100 Hp Hanriot). The monoplane two-seater designed by Pagny is mostly referred to as the Hanriot 1912 monoplane or the Hanriot-Pagny 1912 monoplane.
 The World War I and later biplanes designed by Pierre Dupont received the code 'HD.' followed by a consecutive Arabic number (HD.1, HD.8, HD.32 ...)
 During the short stint as Lorraine-Hanriot, the designation HD. was kept for aircraft already in production but the prefix was changed into LH. for new designs. Around this time, Hanriot also adopted the habit by other French factories to add a number for the subtype directly behind the two-digit type number. Thus the HD.32-series 0 became the HD.320, the next improvement, series 1 became the HD.321 and so on...
 After the merger with Lorraine was dissolved, Hanriot aircraft adopted the single letter 'H.', again followed by a design number. It also kept the now universal French habit of adding the subseries number directly behind the design number. (Hanriot H.180/H.182)

Aircraft

Hanriot 1909 monoplane
Hanriot I
Hanriot Type II
Hanriot III
Hanriot IV Hanriot 1911 military two-seater (Type IV)
Hanriot V Hanriot 1910 monoplane (Type V)
Hanriot VI Hanriot 1910 monoplane (Type VI)
Hanriot VII
Hanriot VIII Hanriot 100 ch monoplane (Type VII)
Hanriot IX
Hanriot-Pagny 1912 monoplane
Hanriot HD.1
Hanriot HD.2
Hanriot HD.3
Hanriot HD.4
Hanriot HD.5
Hanriot HD.6
Hanriot HD.7
Hanriot HD.8
Hanriot HD.9
Hanriot HD.12
Hanriot HD.14
Hanriot HD.15
Hanriot HD.17
Hanriot HD.18
Hanriot HD.19
Hanriot HD.20
Hanriot HD.22
Hanriot HD.24
Hanriot H.25
Hanriot H.26
Hanriot HD.28
Hanriot H.31
Hanriot HD.32
Hanriot H.33
Hanriot H.34
Hanriot H.35
Hanriot H.36
Hanriot H.38
Lorraine-Hanriot LH.10
Lorraine-Hanriot LH.21
Lorraine-Hanriot LH.30
Hanriot H.41
Hanriot H.43
Lorraine-Hanriot LH.60
Lorraine-Hanriot LH.70
Hanriot H.110
Hanriot H.115
Hanriot HD.120
Lorraine-Hanriot LH.130
Hanriot H.180/H.182
Hanriot H.220/SNCAC 600
Hanriot H.2300/H.232

Notes

References
 Bruce J.M. The Hanriot HD 1 Leatherhead: Profile Publications, 1966.
 Davilla, James J., & Soltan, Arthur M., French Aircraft of the First World War. Stratford, Connecticut: Flying Machines Press, 1997. 
  Munson, Kenneth. Pioneer Aircraft 1903-1914 Blandford Press, London 1969.
 Opdycke, Leonard. French Aeroplanes before the Great War. Atglen, PA: Schiffer, 1999

Further reading

External links

Video of flight of 1910 Hanriot plane

Defunct aircraft manufacturers of France
Vehicle manufacturing companies established in 1907
Vehicle manufacturing companies disestablished in 1936
 
French companies established in 1907
1936 disestablishments in France